Federbach may refer to:

Federbach (Alb), a river of Baden-Württemberg, Germany, tributary of the Alb
Federbach (Lindach), a river of Baden-Württemberg, Germany, tributary of the Lindach